Shamuyarira is a surname. Notable people with the surname include:

Nathan Shamuyarira (1928–2014), Zimbabwean nationalist
Norbert Shamuyarira (born 1962), Zimbabwean sculptor